is a Japanese manga series by Akira Amano. It started serialization via Shueisha's online app Jump Live in August 2013, switching to the digital publication Shōnen Jump+ after it launched in September 2014. It has been collected in eleven tankōbon volumes. The first three chapters were published in English by Viz Media in 2014. A 12-episode anime television series adaptation by Pierrot aired between January and March 2017.

Plot
Chūta Kokonose is a middle school boy who has been able to hear a voice that no one else could hear for as long as he could remember. One day, a strange blue alien named Chips appeared and recruited him to the space police, ēlDLIVE because he fit the requirements. During his entrance test, he discovered the voice he hears actually comes from a small white alien living in his body who he later named Dolugh. Combining his power with Dolugh, he was able to complete his exam using a power called SPH (Space Pheromone), used only by aliens. Chūta, now an officer, along with his coworker and classmate, Misuzu Sonokata, and the rest of the Solar System Area station have to work together to protect the universe from dangerous criminals.

Characters

Main characters

A fourteen-year-old second-year student at Shirobori Middle School. He was recruited into élDLIVE by Chips and is now a Rank 1 officer in Division 2 of the Criminal Investigation Department at the Solar System District station. His partners are Misuzu Sonokata, who is also his classmate, and Chips. He is also the symbiotic host of a Monitalien he named Dolugh, who turns out to be the voice that only he can hear ever since he was little. Chūta is initially a very withdrawn, introverted boy with low-self confidence and no friends due to blaming himself for a past childhood incident where four of his friends died by falling off a cliff, and being isolated from his peers because of his tendency to talk to the voice aloud, which made people think he is weird. He begins to grow out of this and slowly gains more confidence due to fighting criminals as an officer of élDLIVE with Misuzu and Dolugh, and saving people. His parents died when he was young and has lived with his aunt ever since. He is very good at all things related to home economics because he has had a lot of practice at home since his aunt Mimi is not very good at doing chores.

Dolugh is a Monitalien living in Chūta's body. He also acts as Chūta's SPH organ. Only Chūta can hear him, and his physical form did not appear until Chūta saved Tateyan. He is attached to Chūta until the day he dies, and if something happens to one of them, the other will feel it. The red gem on his forehead is one of the lost glyphs of Planet Glyph, where he was created for the purpose of monitoring other planets. Dolugh is a very curious and inquisitive creature, who also shows surprising insightfulness. He went through an upgrade during the remote control case and gained wings. His powers work by having Chūta visualize the attack and Dolugh executing it.

Chūta's teammate in Division 2 as well as his classmate who was sent to observe him. She is a Rank 3 officer and takes her job very seriously. At school, she is an ace student and popular with boys. Her reason for joining élDLIVE was because she refused to follow the path her father laid out for her. She lost six months' worth of memories because of her role as a patient in a project called the Taklimakan Project, where patients have SPH organs implanted into them. The operation also caused residual illnesses and she has to take pills to stave them off, though she does not know their true purpose, thinking that they're environmental adaptation pills. She acts coldly towards Chūta when he first joined élDLIVE because she thought he would not take the job seriously, but begins to warm up to him as they work more together and when he proved her innocence during the remote manipulation case. However, after Dolugh's upgrade she began avoiding him due to his smell suddenly changing, but manages to overcome that with the help of Dr. Love. She is also friends with Veronica and Ninotchka because they joined élDLIVE around the same time, though she and Veronica also fight a lot due to their rivalry. Her SPH takes the form of glowing purple rings.

élDLIVE

Solar System Bureau

 The Chief of the Solar System Bureau. He wears an eyepatch to cover his artificial eye. He has a friendly, carefree personality, but also shows hints of a more mysterious, scheming side. However, he cares about his subordinates very much. He is one of the few who knows Misuzu's past. It is hinted that he got his position quickly despite his young age because of other reasons. He is shown enjoying sweets a lot, especially dango. For unknown reasons, he dislikes Madigan.

 A small blue alien who's the leader of Division 2 as well as the one who leads Chūta to élDLIVE. He holds the rank of Assistant Inspector, and act as support during cases. The antenna on his head allows him to shoot different types of SPH, one of which allows people to transfer from place to place. He is very rule-abiding and acts as the voice of reason, but can be childish as well. He says "-chu" at the end of all his sentences. He gets drunk on green tea.

 A criminal investigation assistant inspector and the leader of Division 5 of the CID. She is hot-headed, blunt person who is very competitive, especially against Misuzu. Her, Ninotchka, and Misuzu are friends as they all joined ēlDLIVE around the same time. She has a horn on her forehead that is usually hidden until she activates her SPH, which mainly boosts her leg power.

 A criminal investigation officer who usually goes by the nickname . She is in the 5th division and Veronica's partner. She joined ēlDLIVE around the same time as Veronica and Misuzu, which is how they became friends. A kind, gentle girl, she is also often the one who tries to stop Veronica and Misuzu from fighting and to admonish Veronica whenever she gets too hot-headed. She grew out her long hair to hide her body whenever she activates her SPH, as it causes her body to become very exposed. Her SPH takes the form of green funnels. In Season 4, she enrolled into Shirobori Middle School along with Veronica to bodyguard Dr. Love.

He is 500 years old, though he looks more like a teenage boy currently because of the rejuvenation operation he performed on himself. He was the head of the Taklamakan Project, a project where SPH organs were transplanted into subjects to change their personalities. Misuzu was one of the survivors the project, and he is the one who makes the medicine that she takes. He was the subject of an attempted kidnapping in Season 3 by Darie Lime, who believed that he was the key to opening a "door" in Misuzu's mind that will lead him to a great treasure. After the events of Season 3, he has decided to transfer to Shirobori to study Chuuta and Dolugh up close. He is not very good at talking to women and can get too caught up in his research sometimes.

 

 Vega is anime original character that does not appear in the manga.

Headquarters

Demille

Space Criminals
 / 

 A teacher at Chūta's school. A highly attractive lady with pink hair, lips and eyes, she is commonly seen in Chūta's school wearing a pink top with a huge collar and an extremely short yellow pencil skirt. Apart from being rather slack on the rules, the boys at school are intrigued by her enormous breasts.

Media

Manga
ēlDLIVE, written and illustrated by Akira Amano, began serialization on Shueisha's online app Jump Live on August 1, 2013; it ran for two seasons before moving to Shueisha's new digital publication service Shōnen Jump+ on September 22, 2014. The series finished on November 5, 2018. Shueisha collected its chapters in eleven tankōbon volumes, released from December 4, 2013, to January 4, 2019.

Viz Media published the English translation of the first three chapters in their Weekly Shounen Jump publication from September to October 2014. They released the volumes digitally from April 25, 2017, to October 22, 2019.

On May 30, 2014, a visual book titled Rebo to Dlive was released, featuring new and old illustrations from Amano's works, including ones from ēlDLIVE.

Volumes list

Anime
An anime television series adaptation was announced for January 2017 and aired between January 8, 2017, and March 26, 2017. The series was produced by Pierrot, and directed by Takeshi Furuta and Tomoya Tanaka, with scripts written by Toshimitsu Takeuchi, character designs by Han Seungah and Keiichirou Matsui, and music composed by Yasuharu Takanashi. The opening theme is "Our sympathy" by female singer Alfakyun, and the ending theme is "Kimi no Koe ga..." by the group The Super Ball. Crunchyroll streamed the series. Funimation streamed an English dub. On the last day of 2016, the official website revealed the rough design for the new characters by Akira herself.

Episode list

Reception

Previews
The anime series' first episode received mixed reviews from Anime News Network's staff during the Winter 2017 season previews. Rebecca Silverman noted how the aesthetic of the episode, with its alien designs and story presentation, added to the basic shonen introduction that felt like a return to the fun Saturday morning cartoons of yesteryear. Nick Creamer criticized the first half for having stilted writing and the second half for revealing the show's "fundamental blandness" with a lackluster execution of its premise. Bamboo Dong said that the show would not have the longevity to be in the "Annals of anime history," but gave praise to the overall throwback to '90s cartoons in both its character designs and "sense of nostalgic excitement." Paul Jensen expressed what both Silverman and Dong said about the Saturday morning cartoon quality of the series' episode, saying it will appeal to that kind of audience for a few episodes instead of the average "late-night anime audience." Theron Martin commended the visual style and technical transitions throughout the episode but was critical of the two main leads having generic personality traits.

During its airing in February 2017, the Tokyo Metropolitan Police Department teamed up with ēlDLIVE to fight illegal employment which the posters had put up in some areas around February 2017.

Series reception
Allen Moody of THEM Anime Reviews said about the series overall: "Hardly deep, but a terrific ride; fans of classic sci-fi should have a great time. It's flashy (even if, admittedly, often incredibly silly-though maybe that cheesiness is part of its charm), downright weird at times, and has a number of endearing cast members (and if we have issues with Misuzu's personality, at least her transformation looks impressive.) And it's got that ineffable quality of childlike innocence, in spite of its fanservice, which is a pretty good trick."

References

External links
 ēlDLIVE at Shōnen Jump+ 
 Official anime site 
 Official Viz Media website
 

2010s webcomics
2013 webcomic debuts
2017 anime television series debuts
Adventure anime and manga
Anime series based on manga
Funimation
Japanese webcomics
Pierrot (company)
Science fiction anime and manga
Shōnen manga
Shueisha franchises
Shueisha manga
Webcomics in print
Viz Media manga